Monjulika Chakma (born 26 October 1944) is a Bangladeshi crafts and weaving entrepreneur. She was awarded Begum Rokeya Padak in 2020 for her contribution to the socio-economic development.

Background and career
Chakma was born on 26 October 1944 to Kali Ratan Khisha and Panchalata Khisha. She has 3 sisters and 3 brothers. She learnt weaving in her childhood from her mother.

In 1961, Chakma joined Shah Boys High School as a lecturer. She purchased two traditional looms in 1965 and started applying new weaving techniques. She founded Bain Textile, which has outlets in Rangamati, Cox's Bazar and Dhaka.

Awards
 Begum Rokeya Padak (2020)
 Honorary Fellowship of Bangla Academy for crafts (2018)
 Bangladesh Buddhist Women's Foundation Award (2013)
 Anannya Top Ten Award (2005)
 Outstanding Woman in Business of the Year 2003
 Best Successful Woman Entrepreneur Award (2002)
 Shilu Abed Award (2001)

References

Living people
1944 births
People from Rangamati District
Bangladeshi businesspeople
Bangladeshi women in business
Recipients of Begum Rokeya Padak
Honorary Fellows of Bangla Academy